Chinese Olympics may refer to:

 2008 Summer Olympics in Beijing, China
 2022 Winter Olympics in Beijing, China
 Republic of China at the Olympics (IOC code: ROC) (1924–1948)
 Chinese Taipei at the Olympics (IOC code: ROC, RCF, TWN and TPE) Taiwan (1956–onwards)
 Chinese Taipei Olympic Committee, its National Olympic Committee
 China at the Olympics (IOC code: CHN) People's Republic of China (1952, 1980–onwards)
 Chinese Olympic Committee, its National Olympic Committee